Cypricercus is a genus of ostracods in the family Cyprididae.

References

External links 
 

 

 Cypricercus at insectoid.info

Cyprididae
Podocopida genera